The Temple of Artemis or Artemision, also known as the Temple of Diana, was a Greek temple dedicated to an ancient, local form of the goddess Artemis (identified with Diana, a Roman goddess). It was located in Ephesus (near the modern town of Selçuk in present-day Turkey). By 401 AD it had been ruined or destroyed. Only foundations and fragments of the last temple remain at the site.

The earliest version of the temple (a Bronze Age temenos) antedated the Ionic immigration by many years. Callimachus, in his Hymn to Artemis, attributed it to the Amazons. In the 7th century BC, it was destroyed by a flood. 

Its reconstruction, in more grandiose form, began around 550 BC, under Chersiphron, the Cretan architect, and his son Metagenes. The project was funded by Croesus of Lydia, and took 10 years to complete. This version of the temple was destroyed in 356 BC by an arsonist.

The next, greatest, and last form of the temple, funded by the Ephesians themselves, is described in Antipater of Sidon's list of the world's Seven Wonders:
I have set eyes on the wall of lofty Babylon on which is a road for chariots, and the statue of Zeus by the Alpheus, and the hanging gardens, and the colossus of the Sun, and the huge labour of the high pyramids, and the vast tomb of Mausolus; but when I saw the house of Artemis that mounted to the clouds, those other marvels lost their brilliancy, and I said, "Lo, apart from Olympus, the Sun never looked on aught so grand".

Location and history

Today the site lies on the edge of the modern town of Selçuk.

The sacred site (temenos) at Ephesus was far older than the Artemision itself. Pausanias was certain that it antedated the Ionic immigration by many years, being older even than the oracular shrine of Apollo at Didyma.  He said that the pre-Ionic inhabitants of the city were Leleges and Lydians.  Callimachus, in his Hymn to Artemis attributed the earliest temenos at Ephesus to the Amazons, legendary warrior-women whose religious practise he imagined already centered upon an image (bretas) of Artemis, their matron goddess. Pausanias believed that the temple pre-dated the Amazons.

Pausanias's estimation of the site's antiquity seems well-founded. Before World War I, site excavations by David George Hogarth seemed to identify three successive temple buildings. Re-excavations in 1987–88 and re-appraisal of Hogarth's account  confirmed that the site was occupied as early as the Bronze Age, with a sequence of pottery finds that extend forward to Middle Geometric times, when a peripteral temple with a floor of hard-packed clay was constructed in the second half of the 8th century BC. The peripteral temple at Ephesus offers the earliest example of a peripteral type on the coast of Asia Minor, and perhaps the earliest Greek temple surrounded by colonnades anywhere.

In the 7th century BC, a flood destroyed the temple, depositing over half a meter of sand and flotsam over the original clay floor. Among the flood debris were the remains of a carved ivory plaque of a griffin and the Tree of Life, apparently North Syrian, and some drilled tear-shaped amber drops of elliptical cross-section. These probably once dressed a wooden effigy (xoanon) of the Lady of Ephesus, which must have been destroyed or recovered from the flood. Bammer notes that though the site was prone to flooding, and raised by silt deposits about two metres between the 8th and 6th centuries, and a further 2.4 m between the sixth and the fourth, its continued use "indicates that maintaining the identity of the actual location played an important role in the sacred organization".

Second phase
The new temple was sponsored at least in part by Croesus, who founded Lydia's empire and was overlord of Ephesus. It was designed and constructed from around 550 BC by the Cretan architect Chersiphron and his son Metagenes. It was 115 m (377 ft) long and 46 m (151 ft) wide, supposedly the first Greek temple built of marble. Its peripteral columns stood some 13 m (40 ft) high, in double rows that formed a wide ceremonial passage around the cella that housed the goddess's cult image. Thirty-six of these columns were, according to Pliny, decorated by carvings in relief. A new ebony or blackened grapewood cult statue was sculpted by Endoios, and a naiskos to house it was erected east of the open-air altar.

Foundation deposit

A rich foundation deposit from this era, also called the "Artemision deposit", yielded more than a thousand items, including what may be the earliest coins made from the silver-gold alloy electrum. The deposit contains some of the earliest inscribed coins, those of Phanes, dated to 625–600 BC from Ephesus, with the legend ΦΑΕΝΟΣ ΕΜΙ ΣΗΜΑ (or similar) (“I am the badge of Phanes”), or just bearing the name ΦΑΝΕΟΣ (“of Phanes”).

Fragments of bas-relief on the lowest drums of the temple columns, preserved in the British Museum, show that the enriched columns of the later temple, of which a few survive (illustration below) were versions of this earlier feature. Pliny the Elder, seemingly unaware of the ancient continuity of the sacred site, claims that the new temple's architects chose to build it on marshy ground as a precaution against earthquakes, with lower foundation layers of fleeces and pounded charcoal.

The temple became an important attraction, visited by merchants, kings, and sightseers, many of whom paid homage to Artemis in the form of jewelry and various goods. It also offered sanctuary to those fleeing persecution or punishment, a tradition linked in myth to the Amazons who twice fled there seeking the goddess's protection from punishment, firstly by Dionysus and later, by Heracles. Diogenes Laertius claims that the misanthropic philosopher Heraclitus, thoroughly disapproving of civil life at Ephesus, played knucklebones in the temple with the boys, and later deposited his writings there.

Destruction
In 356 BC, the temple burned down. Various sources describe this as a vainglorious act of arson by a man, Herostratus, who set fire to the wooden roof-beams, seeking fame at any cost; thus the term herostratic fame. For this outrage, the Ephesians sentenced the perpetrator to death and forbade anyone from mentioning his name; but Theopompus later noted it. Aristotle's Meteorology describes the temple's conflagration, but not its cause. In Greek and Roman historical tradition, the temple's destruction coincided with the birth of Alexander the Great (around 20/21 July 356 BC). Plutarch remarks that Artemis was too preoccupied with Alexander's delivery to save her burning temple; he does not specify a cause for the fire.

Herostratus' part in the temple's destruction has been questioned in modern scholarship. Stefan Karweise notes that any arsonist would have needed access to the wooden roof framing;
Dieter Knibbe writes of an "entire corps" of attested temple guards and custodians.
The fire might even have been deliberately and covertly set by the temple's administrators, aware of that the temple's foundation was sinking, but prevented from re-siting it elsewhere by religious constraints; Bammer has noted the conservation of the original sacred location throughout successive rebuildings, despite continued problems with flooding and foundations. Karwiese questions the motive of Herostratus since he only divulged his purpose under torture, which does not fit a man seeking fame.  considers Herostratus a "useful idiot in the service of the priesthood."

Third phase

Alexander offered to pay for the temple's rebuilding; the Ephesians tactfully refused, saying "it would be improper for one god to build a temple to another", and eventually rebuilt it after his death, at their own expense. Work started in 323 BC and continued for many years. The third temple was larger than the second; 137 m (450 ft) long by 69 m (225 ft) wide and 18 m (60 ft) high, with more than 127 columns. Athenagoras of Athens names Endoeus, a pupil of Daedalus, as sculptor of Artemis' main cult image.

Pausanias (c. 2nd century AD) reports another image and altar in the temple, dedicated to Artemis Protothronia (Artemis "of the first seat") and a gallery of images above this altar, including an ancient figure of Nyx (the primordial goddess of Night) by the sculptor Rhoecus (6th century BC). Pliny describes images of Amazons, the legendary founders of Ephesus and Ephesian Artemis' original protégés, carved by Scopas. Literary sources describe the temple's adornment by paintings, columns gilded with gold and silver, and religious works of renowned Greek sculptors Polyclitus, Pheidias, Cresilas, and Phradmon.

Further claims of destruction

This reconstruction survived for 600 years, and appears multiple times in early Christian accounts of Ephesus. According to the New Testament, the appearance of the first Christian missionary in Ephesus caused locals to fear for the temple's dishonor. The 2nd-century Acts of John includes an apocryphal tale of the temple's destruction: the apostle John prayed publicly in the Temple of Artemis, exorcising its demons and "of a sudden the altar of Artemis split in many pieces... and half the temple fell down," instantly converting the Ephesians, who wept, prayed or took flight.

Against this, a Roman edict of 162 AD acknowledges the importance of Artemesion, the annual Ephesian festival to Artemis, and officially extends it from a few holy days over March–April to a whole month, "one of the largest and most magnificent religious festivals in Ephesus' liturgical calendar".

In 268 AD, according to Jordanes, a raid by the Goths, under their leaders "Respa, Veduc and Thurar", "laid waste many populous cities and set fire to the renowned temple of Diana at Ephesus." ; the extent and severity of the damage are unknown; the temple may have lain derelict until its official closure during the  persecution of pagans in the late Roman Empire, Ammonius of Alexandria comments on its closure, perhaps as early as 407, or no later than the mid 5th century. After closure and after the city had become Christian, the name of Artemis appears to have been erased from inscriptions throughout Ephesus.

Cyril of Alexandria credited Archbishop of Constantinople John Chrysostom with destroying the temple, referring to him as "the destroyer of the demons and overthrower of the temple of Diana". A later Archbishop of Constantinople, Proclus, noted the achievements of John, saying "In Ephesus, he despoiled the art of Midas," but there is little evidence to support this claim.

At least some of the stone from the abandoned temple was used in construction of other buildings. A late medieval legend claims that some of the columns in the Hagia Sophia were taken from the Temple of Artemis at Ephesus, but there is no truth to this story.

The main primary sources for the Temple of Artemis at Ephesus are Pliny the Elder's Natural History, Pomponius Mela i:17,  and Plutarch's Life of Alexander  (referencing the burning of the Artemiseum).

Rediscovery of the temple

After six years of searching, the site of the temple was rediscovered in 1869 by an expedition led by John Turtle Wood and sponsored by the British Museum. These excavations continued until 1874. A few further fragments of sculpture were found during the 1904–1906 excavations directed by David George Hogarth. The recovered sculptured fragments of the 4th-century rebuilding and a few from the earlier temple, which had been used in the rubble fill for the rebuilding, were assembled and displayed in the "Ephesus Room" of the British Museum. In addition, the museum has part of possibly the oldest pot-hoard of coins in the world (600 BC) that had been buried in the foundations of the Archaic temple.

Today the site of the temple, which lies just outside Selçuk, is marked by a single column constructed of dissociated fragments discovered on the site.

Cult and influence
The archaic temeton beneath the later temples clearly housed some form of "Great Goddess" but nothing is known of her cult. The literary accounts that describe it as "Amazonian" refer to the later founder-myths of Greek emigrés who developed the cult and temple of Artemis Ephesia. The wealth and splendor of temple and city were taken as evidence of Artemis Ephesia's power, and were the basis for her local and international prestige: despite the successive traumas of Temple destruction, each rebuilding – a gift and honor to the goddess – brought further prosperity. Large numbers of people came to Ephesus in March and in the beginning of May to attend the main Artemis Procession.
 
Artemis' shrines, temples and festivals (Artemisia) could be found throughout the Greek world, but Ephesian Artemis was unique. The Ephesians considered her theirs, and resented any foreign claims to her protection. Once Persia ousted and replaced their Lydian overlord Croesus, the Ephesians played down his contribution to the temple's restoration. On the whole, the Persians dealt fairly with Ephesus, but removed some religious artifacts from Artemis' Temple to Sardis and brought Persian priests into her Ephesian cult; this was not forgiven. When Alexander conquered the Persians, his offer to finance the temple's second rebuilding was politely but firmly refused. Ephesian Artemis lent her city's diplomacy a powerful religious edge.

Under Hellenic rule, and later, under Roman rule, the Ephesian Artemisia festival was increasingly promoted as a key element in the pan-Hellenic festival circuit. It was part of a definitively Greek political and cultural identity, essential to the economic life of the region, and an excellent opportunity for young, unmarried Greeks of both sexes to seek out marriage partners. Games, contests and theatrical performances were held in the goddess's name, and Pliny describes her procession as a magnificent crowd-puller; it was shown in one of Apelles' best paintings, which depicted the goddess's image carried through the streets and surrounded by maidens. In the Roman Imperial era, the emperor Commodus lent his name to the festival games, and might have sponsored them.

Ephesian Artemis

From the Greek point of view, the Ephesian Artemis is a distinctive form of their goddess Artemis. In Greek cult and myth, Artemis is the twin sister of Apollo, a virgin goddess of the hunt, the wilderness and the moon, who, despite being a goddess of childbirth was nevertheless known for her chastity. At Ephesus, a goddess whom the Greeks associated with Artemis was venerated in an archaic, pre-Hellenic cult image that was carved of wood (a xoanon) and kept decorated with jewelry. 

The features are most similar to Near-Eastern and Egyptian deities, and least similar to Greek ones. The body and legs are enclosed within a tapering pillar-like term, from which the goddess' feet protrude. On the coins minted at Ephesus, the goddess wears a mural crown (like a city's walls), an attribute of Cybele as a protector of cities (see polos).

The traditional interpretation of the oval objects covering the upper part of the Ephesian Artemis is that they represent multiple breasts, symbolizing her fertility. This interpretation began in late antiquity and resulted in designations of the Ephesian goddess as Diana Efesia Multimammia and other related descriptions. This interpretation was rooted in Minucius Felix and Jerome's Christian attacks on pagan popular religion, and modern scholarship has cast doubt on the traditional interpretation that the statue depicts a many-breasted goddess. 

Evidence suggests that the oval objects were not intended to depict part of the goddess' anatomy at all. In some versions of the statue, the goddess' skin has been painted black, likely to emulate the aged wood of the original, while her clothes and regalia, including the so-called "breasts", were left unpainted or cast in different colors. 

Robert Fleischer suggested that instead of breasts, the oval objects were decorations that would have been hung ceremonially on the original wood statue (possibly eggs or the scrotal sacs of sacrificed bulls), and which were incorporated as carved features on later copies. The "breasts" of the Lady of Ephesus, it now appears, were likely based on amber gourd-shaped drops, elliptical in cross-section and drilled for hanging, that were rediscovered in the archaeological excavations of 1987–1988. These objects remained in place where the ancient wooden statue of the goddess had been caught by an 8th-century flood. This form of jewelry, then, had already been developed by the Geometric Period.

On the coins she rests either arm on a staff formed of entwined serpents or of a stack of ouroboroi, the eternal serpent with its tail in its mouth. In some accounts, the Lady of Ephesus was attended by eunuch priests called "Megabyzoi"; this could have been a proper name or a title. The practise of ritual self-emasculation as qualification to serve a deity is usually identified with Cybele's eunuch mendicant priests, the Galli. The Megabyzoi of Ephesian Artemis were assisted by young, virgin girls (korai).

A votive inscription mentioned by Florence Mary Bennett, which dates probably from about the 3rd century BC, associates Ephesian Artemis with Crete: "To the Healer of diseases, to Apollo, Giver of Light to mortals, Eutyches has set up in votive offering [a statue of] the Cretan Lady of Ephesus, the Light-Bearer."

The Greek habits of syncretism assimilated all foreign gods under some form of the Olympian pantheon familiar to them—in interpretatio graeca—and it is clear that at Ephesus, the identification with Artemis that the Ionian settlers made of the "Lady of Ephesus" was slender. Nevertheless, later Greeks and Romans identified her with both Artemis and Diana, and there was a tradition in ancient Rome that identified her with the goddess Isis as well.

The Christian approach was at variance with the syncretistic approach of pagans to gods who were not theirs.  A Christian inscription at Ephesus suggests why so little remains at the site:
Destroying the delusive image of the demon Artemis, Demeas has erected this symbol of Truth, the God that drives away idols, and the Cross of priests, deathless and victorious sign of Christ.

The assertion that the Ephesians thought that their cult image had fallen from the sky, though it was a familiar origin-myth at other sites, is only known at Ephesus from Acts 19:35:

What man is there that knoweth not how that the city of the Ephesians is a worshipper of the great goddess Diana, and of the [image] which fell down from Jupiter?

Lynn LiDonnici observes that modern scholars are likely to be more concerned with origins of the Lady of Ephesus and her iconology than her adherents were at any point in time, and are prone to creating a synthetic account of the Lady of Ephesus by drawing together documentation that ranges over more than a millennium in its origins, creating a falsified, unitary picture, as of an unchanging icon.

Panorama

See also
 List of Ancient Greek temples

References

Works cited

Further reading
Rodríguez Moya, Inmaculada, and Víctor Mínguez. 2017. The Seven Ancient Wonders In the Early Modern World. New York: Routledge. 
Romer, John, and Elizabeth Romer. 1995. The Seven Wonders of the World: A History of the Modern Imagination. 1st American ed. New York: Henry Holt.

External links

 World History Encyclopedia - Temple of Artemis at Ephesus
 Temple of Artemis (Ephesos) objects at the British Museum website
 Florence Mary Bennett, Religious Cults Associated with the Amazons: (1912): Chapter III: Ephesian Artemis (text)
 James Grout: Temple of Artemis, part of the Encyclopædia Romana
 Diana's Temple at Ephesus (W. R. Lethaby, 1908)
 Pictures of the current situation

6th-century BC religious buildings and structures
Buildings and structures demolished in the 5th century
1869 archaeological discoveries
Ancient Greek buildings and structures
Ancient Greek religion
Buildings and structures in İzmir Province
Destroyed temples
Ephesus
Religious buildings and structures destroyed by arson
Seven Wonders of the Ancient World
Temples in ancient Ionia
Temples of Artemis
Tourist attractions in İzmir Province
Persecution of pagans in the late Roman Empire